This is a list of notable events in Latin music (i.e. Spanish- and Portuguese-speaking music from Latin America, Europe, and the United States) that took place in 2013.

Events
April 2 – Spanish singer Julio Iglesias is acknowledged by the Guinness World Records as the bestselling Latin artist of all-time.
May 13: – Tejano music singer Oscar De La Rosa (frontman of La Mafia) was physically assaulted by a fan after the singer refused to take a photo with him while attending a gay bar in Houston.
November 20 – Cuban musician Arturo Sandoval is among sixteen people who received the Presidential Medal of Freedom.
November 21 — The 14th Annual Latin Grammy Awards are held in Las Vegas. 
"Vivir Mi Vida" by Marc Anthony wins Record of the Year.
"Volví a Nacer" by Andrés Castro and Carlos Vives wins Song of the Year.
Gaby Moreno wins Best New Artist.
Vida by Draco Rosa wins Album of the Year.
Miguel Bosé is recognized as the Person of the Year by the Latin Recording Academy.
December 20 — The Recording Industry Association of America announces the creation of the Latin Digital Singles award for Latin digital singles and also lowers the threshold for Latin album certifications.

Number-ones albums and singles by country
List of Hot 100 number-one singles of 2013 (Brazil)
List of number-one songs of 2013 (Colombia)
List of number-one albums of 2013 (Mexico)
List of number-one albums of 2013 (Portugal)
List of number-one albums of 2013 (Spain)
List of number-one singles of 2013 (Spain)
List of number-one Billboard Latin Albums from the 2010s
List of number-one Billboard Hot Latin Songs of 2013

Awards
2013 Premio Lo Nuestro
2013 Billboard Latin Music Awards
2013 Latin Grammy Awards
2013 Tejano Music Awards

Albums released

First quarter

January

February

March

Second quarter

April

May

June

Third quarter

July

August

September

Fourth quarter

October

November

December

Unknown

Best-selling records

Best-selling albums
The following is a list of the top 10 best-selling Latin albums in the United States in 2013, according to Billboard.

Best-performing songs
The following is a list of the top 10 best-performing Latin songs in the United States in 2013, according to Billboard.

Deaths
April 8 – Sara Montiel, 85, Spanish singer and actress
May 15 – Manolo Galván, 66, Spanish/Argentine singer-songwriter
June 22 – Leandro Díaz, 90, Colombian composer
July 7 – MC Daleste, 20, Brazilian rapper 
August 7 – Betty Pino, 65, Ecuadorian radio host
August 19 – Eduardo Falú, 90, Argentine folk guitarist and composer
September 27 – Oscar Castro-Neves, 73, Brazilian guitarist, arranger, and composer

References 

 
Latin music by year